Eleanor Taylor Bland (December 31, 1944 – June 2, 2010) was an African-American writer of crime fiction. She was the creator of Lincoln Prairie, Illinois (based on Waukegan, Illinois) police detective Marti McAllister.

Biography
Bland was born in Boston, Massachusetts, and married Anthony Bland, a member of the United States Navy, when she was fourteen. In the early 1970s, they relocated to the Naval Station Great Lakes in North Chicago, Illinois She and her husband remained together for 31 years before separating.

Bland received a BA from the University of Southern Illinois in 1981, and from 1981 to 1999 worked as an accountant. She had two children and several grandchildren, and resided in Waukegan, Illinois, during the later years of her life.

She was diagnosed with Gardner's syndrome in the 1970s, and was reportedly given only two years to live at the time. However, Bland lived forty more years. She died from Gardner's Syndrome on June 2, 2010, in Waukegan, Illinois.

Following her death, the organization of mystery writers Sisters in Crime created the "Eleanor Taylor Bland Crime Fiction Writers of Color Award" in her honor.

Works
Bland's first novel, Dead Time (1992), introduced her sleuth, African-American police detective Marti MacAlister, recently transferred from Chicago to the small town of Lincoln Prairie, Illinois. However, her second book, Slow Burn, was actually the first one written but no publisher wanted it.

Several novels featuring Marti MacAlister followed. Marti works in collaboration with a male partner, Polish-American Vik Jessenovik, and their contrasting styles have been described as city-reared, streetwise, spunky and intuitive and Baptist (Marti) versus meticulous and small-town-minded  Catholic (Vik).

Family and community life, and social issues, are also strong elements in the novels.

In a survey of women detectives in crime fiction, Maureen Reddy points out that almost all African American women writers create detectives who have children and a family life. Bland herself once commented that "the most significant contribution that we have made, collectively, to mystery fiction is the development of the extended family; the permanence of spouses and significant others, most of whom don't die in the first three chapters; children who are complex, wanted and loved; and even pets."

Books
 Dead Time (1992)
 Slow Burn (1993)
 Gone Quiet (1994)
 Done Wrong (1995) , 
 Keep Still (1996)
 See No Evil New York : St. Martin's Press, 1998. , 
 Tell No Tales (1999) , 
 Scream in Silence (2000)
 Whispers in the Dark (2001)
 Windy City Dying (2002)
 Fatal Remains (2003)
 A Cold and Silent Dying (2004)
 A Dark and Deadly Deception (2005)
 Suddenly a Stranger (2007)

Editor
Shades of Black: Crime and Mystery Stories by African American Authors (2004)

See also
Police Procedural
Crime fiction
Mystery (fiction)
Detective
List of female detective/mystery writers
List of female detective characters

References

1944 births
2010 deaths
20th-century American novelists
American women novelists
African-American novelists
American mystery writers
Roman Catholic writers
People from Waukegan, Illinois
Writers from Boston
Southern Illinois University alumni
21st-century American novelists
Women mystery writers
20th-century American women writers
21st-century American women writers
People from North Chicago, Illinois
PEN Oakland/Josephine Miles Literary Award winners
Novelists from Massachusetts
20th-century African-American women writers
20th-century African-American writers
21st-century African-American women writers
21st-century African-American writers